The following is a list of canoeists who will compete at the 2020 Summer Olympics in Tokyo, Japan. Canoeists will compete in 4 slalom and 12 sprint events.

Canoe Slalom 
This table lists the athletes competing in canoe slalom events at the 2020 Olympics, along with their ICF World Ranking going into the event. Eight female athletes competing in both the K1W and C1W disciplines provide additional places in each event, increasing the total athletes to 27 and 22, respectively.

Canoe Sprint

Male 
This table lists the male athletes competing in individual canoe sprint events at the 2020 Olympics, in alphabetical order by nation.

This table lists the male athletes competing in team boats at the 2020 Olympics, in alphabetical order by nation.

Female 
This table lists the female athletes competing in individual canoe sprint events at the 2020 Olympics, in alphabetical order by nation.

This table lists the female athletes competing in team boats at the 2020 Olympics, in alphabetical order by nation.

References

Canoeing at the 2020 Summer Olympics
Canoe
Lists of canoeists